The 2006 United States Senate election in Nebraska was held November 7, 2006. Incumbent Democrat Ben Nelson won re-election to a second term, defeating Republican Pete Ricketts with 63.9% of the vote to Ricketts' 36.1%. Ricketts would later become Governor after winning the 2014 gubernatorial election and subsequently be appointed to Nebraska's other senate seat by Governor Jim Pillen, Ricketts' immediate successor.

Democratic primary

Candidates 
 Ben Nelson, incumbent U.S. Senator

Results

Republican primary

Candidates 
 Pete Ricketts, former COO of TD Ameritrade
 Don Stenberg, former Attorney General of Nebraska and nominee for the U.S. Senate in 2000
 David J. Kramer, Former Chairman of the Nebraska Republican Party

Campaign 
Since Ricketts was a millionaire, he could finance his own campaign. His opponents could not raise enough money to keep up. Kramer raised $330,000 and Stenberg raised $246,000 in 2005.

Results

General election

Candidates 
 Ben Nelson (D), incumbent U.S. Senator
 Pete Ricketts (R), former COO of TD Ameritrade

Campaign 
The primary election was held May 9, 2006. Pete Ricketts won the Republican nomination with 48% of the vote. Ben Nelson was unopposed for the Democratic nomination. Nelson was elected in 2000 by a margin of 51% to 49% after serving as the state's governor for two terms. Nelson, considered the most conservative Democrat in the Senate, was the lone Democrat in Nebraska's Congressional delegation. This election was one of the most expensive in Nebraska history. In 2005, Ben Nelson raised $3.9 million for his re-election campaign. Pete Ricketts contributed $14.35 million of his own money to his campaign; he raised an additional $485,000 in contributions. The race also attracted national attention and generated several high-level campaign appearances. President George W. Bush appeared at a rally for Ricketts on November 5, 2006, in Grand Island, while then-U.S. Senator Barack Obama appeared at a fundraiser for Nelson and other Nebraska Democrats on May 5, 2006 in Omaha. However, he won re-election by a large margin.

Predictions

Polling

Results

Results by county
From CNN

See also 
 2006 United States Senate elections

References

External links 
 Ben Nelson for U.S. Senate (Not Active)
 Pete Ricketts for U.S. Senate (Inactive)

Nebraska
2006
2006 Nebraska elections
Ricketts family